The 1977 Wyoming Cowboys football team was an American football team that represented the University of Wyoming as a member of the Western Athletic Conference (WAC) during the 1977 NCAA Division I football season.  In their first season under head coach Bill Lewis, the Cowboys compiled a 4–6–1 record (4–3 against conference opponents), finished in fourth place out of eight teams in the WAC, and were outscored by a total of 273 to 166. They played its home games at War Memorial Stadium in Laramie, Wyoming.

Schedule

References

Wyoming
Wyoming Cowboys football seasons
Wyoming Cowboys football